Los Roques (T-93AB) is the third of four Damen Stan Lander 5612 landing crafts Venezuela ordered from Dutch shipbuilding firm the Damen Group, for the Bolivarian Navy of Venezuela. They were built in one of Damen's shipyards in Cuba.  Her sister ships are the AB Los Frailes (T-91), AB Los Testigos (T-92), AB Los Monjes (T-94).

They were designed for a crew of 16. This class of vessel is designed to carry vehicles, or standard sized shipping containers.  They carry a large crane for handling deck cargo, like shipping containers.  Operators can prepare a special set of containers which can be transported to set up various kinds of temporary facilities. The Royal Bahamas Defence Force had a special set of containers containing a portable hospital, so it lander, the HMBS Lawrence Major could provide disaster relief.

References 
 

Landing craft of the Bolivarian Navy of Venezuela